The Simberi mine is one of the largest gold mines in Papua New Guinea and in the world. The mine is located in the north of the country on Simberi Island, New Ireland Province. The mine, owned by St Barbara Limited, has estimated reserves of 3.3 million oz of gold.

References 

Gold mines in Papua New Guinea
New Ireland Province